is a Japanese former Nippon Professional Baseball infielder/outfielder. His elder brother Seiji is also a professional baseball player.

Life 
After graduating from high school, Tomashino went on to Chuo University. There he played as an outfielder and was especially useful because he also protected the infield.

At the 1988 draft meeting, Tomashino agreed to join the Tokyo Yakult Swallows with a contract fee of ¥50 million and an annual salary of ¥6 million.

Since 1989, he has been active with his fast feet as a weapon, and participated in the junior all-star game. That year, he was active as a second baseman instead of his main outfielder position and recorded 32 stolen bases and was awarded the Nippon Professional Baseball Rookie of the Year Award. Kozo Shoda of Hiroshima won the title of the base stealing king with 34 bases. The following year, Tomashino's opportunities decreased under the supervision of Katsuya Nomura, and as a result, his first year became his career-high.

After his career as a baseball player, he has been a commentator for Nippon Cultural Broadcasting, Fuji TV One's PROFESSIONAL BASEBALL NEWS, and TV Shinhiroshima.

Family 
Tomashino is married to former talent and idol singer Matsumoto Noriko and the two have three sons.

References 

1966 births
Living people
Baseball people from Osaka Prefecture
Chuo University alumni
Nippon Professional Baseball infielders
Nippon Professional Baseball outfielders
Yakult Swallows players
Hiroshima Toyo Carp players
Nippon Professional Baseball Rookie of the Year Award winners
Nippon Professional Baseball coaches
Japanese baseball coaches
Baseball players at the 1988 Summer Olympics
Olympic baseball players of Japan
Olympic silver medalists for Japan
Medalists at the 1988 Summer Olympics